Around a Small Mountain is a 2009 French drama film directed by Jacques Rivette, which was his final film before his death on 29 January 2016, and starred Jane Birkin and Sergio Castellitto. It was screened in the main competition at the 66th Venice International Film Festival.

Plot
Kate (Jane Birkin) is driving along a winding mountain road when her car stalls. Vittorio (Sergio Castellitto) happens along, stops, and fixes her car without ever speaking to her. After he drives away, he slows down and decides to turn back. Something about the woman has interested him.

Later in town, Vittorio learns that Kate has returned to join her family's traveling circus after leaving under mysterious conditions fifteen years ago. Kate's lover was killed during a performance. Intrigued by Kate's story, Vittorio stays for the show, and then decides to stay in town for a while, booking the room above a local cafe. He begins to attend all the shows, fascinated by the circus and the lives of its performers—all the while trying to discover the secret that led to Kate's sudden departure.

When the circus caravan leaves town, Vittorio follows. With nowhere to go and nothing else to do, both he and Kate seem to be running away with the circus. Gradually he learns about the buried past of the circus and the buried careers of its performers.

Cast
 Jane Birkin as Kate
 Sergio Castellitto as Vittorio
 André Marcon as Alexandre
 Jacques Bonnaffé as Marlo
 Julie-Marie Parmentier as Clémence
 Hélène de Vallombreuse as Margot
 Tintin Orsoni as Wilfrid
 Vimala Pons as Barbara
 Mikaël Gaspar as Tom
 Stéphane Laisné as Stéphane
 Dominique D'Angelo as Dom
 Hélène De Bissy as La patronne de l'auberge
 Pierre Barayre as Le patron de l'auberge
 Marie-Paule André as Estelle
 Julie-Anne Roth as Xénie
 Elodie Mamou as Elodie

Reception

Critical reception
On review aggregator website Rotten Tomatoes, the film holds an approval rating of 74% based on 19 reviews, and an average rating of 6.3/10. On Metacritic, the film has a weighted average score of 63 out of 100, based on 6 critics, indicating "generally favorable reviews".

In his review for the Chicago Sun-Times, Roger Ebert gave the film three out of four stars, writing:

Awards and nominations
 2010 Italian National Syndicate of Film Journalists Silver Ribbon Nomination for Best Actor (Sergio Castellitto)
 2009 Venice Film Festival Golden Lion Nomination (Jacques Rivette)

References

External links
 

2009 films
2000s French-language films
2009 drama films
French drama films
Films directed by Jacques Rivette
Italian drama films
2000s French films